Clever Raccoon Dog is a North Korean animated television series produced by SEK Studio which aired on North Korean state television.
The series was produced for a number of years and features both old and new animation style, depending on the production year of each episode.
The series focuses on three main characters: A raccoon dog, A male bear and A female cat, often involved in minor adventures or incidents. 
Each episode has a scholastic element or a particular message, focusing on matters as scientific information, road safety, commitment to sport and contests, among others. The first 9 episodes (episode 5, 6, 7, 8, 10, 12, 14, 22, 23) are co-produced with the French animation studio Col.Ima.Son and P.M.M.P.

Characters

Main Characters 

 Neoguri/Raccoon Dog (너구리): A brown raccoon dog. He is smart and kind.

 Gom/Bear (곰): A brown bear. He is strong and greedy.

 Yaung-i/Cat (야웅이): A blue cat. she is naughty. Her gender is unclear, and even SEK's staff are confused. Although listed as female in international dubs and some DVDs and merchandise, she is considered a "boy" in some episodes. There is no clear answer from the producers about this.

Minor Characters 

 Kkolkkol-i/Piglet (꼴꼴이): He is a mischievous baby pig. He first appeared in episode 65 and is younger than Neoguri, Gom, and Yaungi.
 Mem-me/Baby Goat (멤메): He is Neoguri's classmate.
 Ppiyong-i/Chick (삐용이): He is a baby chick and appeared in episode 47.
 Jangsugom/Uncle Bear (장수곰/곰삼촌): He is Gom's uncle and first appeared in episode 71. He has a job manufacturing canned fish and is attacked and knocked down by hungry wolf thieves.
 Kkangchong-i Annaewon/Guide Rabbit (깡총이 안내원): She is the village guide and reporter, and wears a fancy pink dress. She first appeared in episode 67.
 Yang Ajumeoni/Mrs. Sheep (양아주머니): She is a sheep wearing a light pink dress. She first appeared in episode 70.
 Yeomso Hal-abeoji/Mr. Goat (염소 할아버지)
 Yeou Doduk/Thief Fox (여우도둑): She is a thief who tries to steal a Neoguri's robot crab.
 Keungoyang-i/Captain Lynx (큰고양이): He is a lynx wearing an eyepatch. He tries to steal Neoguri's robot crab with a fox, but ultimately fails.

Voice Cast 

 Neoguri : Song Young-Suk (Episode 47-54) → Rim Bok-Hui (Episode 55) → Song Young-Suk (Episode 56-59) → Rim Bok-Hui (Episode 60-65) → Han Ok-Won (Episode 66-)
 Gom : Won Jong-Suk (Episode 47-62) → Rim Un-Yong (Episode 63) → Rim Bok-Hui (Episode 64-)
 Yaungi : Kwon Nyong-Ju (Episode 47-55) → Rim Un-Yong (Episode 55-62) → Lee Eun-Ju (Episode 63-)
 Thief Fox : Rim Bok-Hui
 Captain Lynx : Mok Geum-Sung
 Thief Mouse : Dong Yun-Mi
 Pilot Weasel : Park Sung-Il

Media 
63 episodes (1-63) have been released on DVD by Mokran Video.

The series resumed in 2021, with episode 64 being aired on the 19th of December. These newly produced episodes featured new actresses.

On February 4th, 2023, The Pyongyang Times annonced the production of episodes 70, 71 and 72. These episodes are respectively titled "Orange Necklace", "Waterproof Cloth" and "Plastic Magnet".

Episodes 
 English title list is almost written according to formal DVD translation, and asterisk marks mean personal translation, which is because their English names do not exist in it.

Reception 
In the late 2000s, it was dubbed into English by Mondo TV as The Little Bear which is not to be confused with the Little Bear series of books.

Philately 
On June 21, 1989, the DPRK issued three postage stamps, dedicated to Measurement of Height, an episode of the series.

Notes

External links 
 령리한 너구리  at Namuwiki
 

1987 North Korean television series debuts
1980s North Korean television series
1980s animated comedy television series
North Korean animated television series